Anthony Battaglia (born August 15, 1979) is an American professional ice hockey player, who retired in February 2014.

Playing career
After one season of junior hockey playing for the Soo Indians, Battaglia played college ice hockey for Western Michigan University.  He spent four years at WMU and played in 139 games, and scored 47 points in the process.  His solid but unspectacular scoring record led to him signing for the Florida Everblades in the ECHL for the 2002–03 season.  Battaglia played almost 50 games for the Everblades, but managed just 13 points.  He would also play at the higher AHL level for the Lowell Lock Monsters on 9 occasions, but failed to score a single point.

For the 2003–04 season, Battaglia would sign for another ECHL organization, the Mississippi Sea Wolves.  Battaglia settled well, and in his first season made 67 regular season appearances, scoring 37 points.  He would also feature in the post-season and was one of the Sea Wolves' most reliable players, with 6 points in 5 games.  His productivity meant that he would remain in Mississippi for the 2004–05 season, and Battaglia again flourished.  In 75 games, he managed to score 60 points, proving his quality at ECHL level.  Battaglia also played with his brother Jon Bates Battaglia, who signed with the Sea Wolves during the NHL lockout.  The Sea Wolves suspended operations in the middle of the off-season because of Hurricane Katrina.

Battaglia would remain in the ECHL, but split the 2005–06 season between the Utah Grizzlies and the Augusta Lynx.  Despite the lack of consistency, Battaglia managed to maintain his level of play, and in 72 games for the two teams, scored 54 points.  Battaglia would again move teams in the off-season, signing for the Columbia Inferno.  He played well and in 47 games scored 45 points.  This led to his mid-season move in March 2007 to sign for the EIHL team, the Manchester Phoenix.  It was Battaglia's first taste of European hockey, but he continued to impress with 13 points in the 13 games he featured in before the season ended.  Despite impressing, Battaglia returned to North America and re-signed for the Inferno, and once again became an important player for the organization.  In March 2008, Battaglia was part of a 5 player swap which sent him again to the Augusta Lynx. On 4 September 2008 his move to the Mississippi Sea Wolves was confirmed.  For the 2009–10 season, Battaglia played with the Amarillo Gorillas of the Central Hockey League.

On August 24, 2010, Battaglia signed with the Mississippi RiverKings, to remain in the Central Hockey League. After playing in 16 games with the RiverKings to start the 2010–11 season, Battaglia was released and signed with fellow CHL team the Tulsa Oilers on December 24, 2010.  For the 2011–12 season, Battaglia moved to the Federal Hockey League, playing for the New Jersey Outlaws.  He followed the franchise to Williamsport, Pennsylvania, for the 2012–13, playing with team until it folded on January 21, 2013. He then joined the Huntsville Havoc of the Southern Professional Hockey League.  Battaglia played in the Federal Hockey League for the Dayton Demonz.
He finished his hockey days with the Mississippi Surge of the Southern Professional Hockey League when he retired on February 18, 2014.

Personal life
Anthony and his brother Bates competed in and won The Amazing Race 22.

Career statistics

References

External links
 

1979 births
Living people
Ice hockey people from Chicago
American men's ice hockey left wingers
Amarillo Gorillas players
Augusta Lynx players
Columbia Inferno players
Florida Everblades players
Huntsville Havoc players
Kalamazoo Wings (2007–2009) players
Lowell Lock Monsters players
Manchester Phoenix players
Mississippi RiverKings (CHL) players
Mississippi Sea Wolves players
Mississippi Surge players
Reality show winners
Soo Indians players
Tulsa Oilers (1992–present) players
Utah Grizzlies (ECHL) players
Western Michigan Broncos men's ice hockey players
The Amazing Race (American TV series) contestants